Varennes refers to Varennes-en-Argonne in France.

Varennes is also the name of several places:

France

Varennes is the name of several communes in France:
 Varennes, Dordogne
 Varennes, Haute-Garonne
 Varennes, Indre-et-Loire
 Varennes, Somme
 Varennes, Tarn-et-Garonne
 Varennes, Vienne
 Varennes, Yonne

It is also part of the name of several communes in France:
 Varennes-Changy, in the Loiret département
 Varennes-Jarcy, in the Essonne département
 Varennes-le-Grand, in the Saône-et-Loire département
 Varennes-lès-Mâcon, in the Saône-et-Loire département
 Varennes-lès-Narcy, in the Nièvre département
 Varennes-Saint-Honorat, in the Haute-Loire département
 Varennes-Saint-Sauveur, in the Saône-et-Loire département
 Varennes-sous-Dun, in the Saône-et-Loire département
 Varennes-sur-Allier, in the Allier département
 Varennes-sur-Fouzon, in the Indre département
 Varennes-sur-Loire, in the Maine-et-Loire département
 Varennes-sur-Morge, in the Puy-de-Dôme département
 Varennes-sur-Seine, in the Seine-et-Marne département
 Varennes-sur-Tèche, in the Allier département
 Varennes-sur-Usson, in the Puy-de-Dôme département
 Varennes-Vauzelles, in the Nièvre département
 Courtemont-Varennes, in the Aisne département
 Saint-Loup-de-Varennes, in the Saône-et-Loire département
 Saint-Pierre-de-Varennes, in the Saône-et-Loire département

Canada

 Varennes, Quebec 
 Varennes, Winnipeg, a neighbourhood of Winnipeg, Manitoba, Canada
 Varennes County, a county established 1881 in the disputed District of Keewatin, Canada

See also

 La Varenne (disambiguation)
 Varenne, a racehorse
 Pierre Gaultier de Varennes, sieur de La Vérendrye, a Canadian explorer